The Suspicious Death of a Minor, a.k.a. Too Young to Die, is a 1975 Italian giallo film directed by Sergio Martino.

Plot summary 

Police detective Paolo Germi (Claudio Cassinelli) and the mysterious Marisa meet each other at a dance hall. Germi is unaware of the secret Marisa carries with her: adverse conditions in her life have forced her into prostitution. As Germi finds the young girl brutally murdered, he decides to go after her killers. During his investigation, he enters a world of intrigue and obfuscation that leave an endless trail of blood.

Cast 

Claudio Cassinelli as Paolo Germi 
Mel Ferrer as Police superintendent
Lia Tanzi as Carmela 
Gianfranco Barra as Teti 
Patrizia Castaldi as Marisa 
Adolfo Caruso as Giannino 
Jenny Tamburi as Gloria 
Massimo Girotti as Gaudenzio Pesce 
Barbara Magnolfi as Floriana 
Franca Scagnetti as Mother of Giannino

Production
The Suspicious Death of a Minor was developed under the title Milano Violenta, a title later used for Mario Caiano's film Bloody Payroll. The film was a hybrid of a crime film and a giallo. The screenwriter, Ernesto Gastaldi, later spoke about the film stating "In my opinion, it's a minor film [...] the usually very good Martino didn't manage to give the film a decisive shot-in-the-arm."

Release
The Suspicious Death of a Minor was distributed theatrically by Titanus in Italy on 12 August 1975. The film grossed a total of 507,396,250 Italian lire on its domestic release. The film is also known as Too Young to Die.

Notes

References

External links

1975 films
1970s crime comedy films
Giallo films
1970s Italian-language films
Films directed by Sergio Martino
Films with screenplays by Ernesto Gastaldi
1975 comedy films
Films set in Milan
1970s Italian films